A F M Yusuf Haider is a Bangladeshi  academic and scientist. Haider was appointed as the pro-vice-chancellor of the University of Dhaka for 6 years. He served as the 25th vice-chancellor (acting) of the university from 1 August 2002 until 23 September 2002.

Education
Haider completed his bachelor's and master's in nuclear physics from the University of Dhaka in 1969 and 1970 respectively. He earned his Ph.D. from Australian National University in 1984.

Career
Haider served as the pro-vice-chancellor of the University of Dhaka from 25 July 2002 until 23 January 2009.

References

Living people
University of Dhaka alumni
Australian National University alumni
Academic staff of the University of Dhaka
Vice-Chancellors of the University of Dhaka
Bangladeshi physicists
Year of birth missing (living people)